Ciucea is a commune of Cluj County, Transylvania, Romania, situated 20 km northwest of Huedin on the right bank of the Crișul Repede River. It is composed of two villages, Ciucea and Vânători (Börvény). It also included three other villages from 1968 to 2002, when these were split off to form Negreni Commune.

Endre Ady lived in the Castle during World War I, when it was owned by the family of his wife Berta Boncza.

The Octavian Goga Memorial House is located in Ciucea.

Demographics 
According to the census from 2002 there was a total population of 4,426 people living in this town. Of this population, 99.23% are ethnic Romanians, 0.61% are ethnic Hungarians and 0.09% ethnic Roma.

Picture gallery

References
Atlasul localităților județului Cluj (Cluj County Localities Atlas), Suncart Publishing House, Cluj-Napoca,

Notes

Communes in Cluj County
Localities in Transylvania